Villa Dos Trece is a settlement in northern Argentina. It is located in Formosa Province.

Populated places in Formosa Province